SS Fatima was the first ship ever registered in Karachi, Pakistan in 1948. It was cargo vessel belonging to East & West Steamship Company.

Name
The ship was named after Mohtarma Fatima Jinnah, the First Lady of Pakistan.

History
She was built by Burn and Company, Howrah, Calcutta in 1942. She was then a 'Basset' class naval trawler of the Royal Indian Navy under the name SHILLONG, pennant number T.250, deployed in anti-submarine and minesweeping duties. Her engine was a triple-expansion steam engine built by Lobnitz & Company, Renfrew. Sold out of the navy in 1947 and converted to a cargo ship in 1948. On 11 August 1948, she was registered at the newly established Port of Registry at Karachi.

Specifications
 Gross tonnage: 671
 LOA: 153 feet

Fate
It was scrapped in March 1962.

References

Ships of Pakistan
1942 ships